Clementine Hunter (pronounced Clementeen; late December 1886 or early January 1887 – January 1, 1988) was a self-taught Black folk artist from the Cane River region of Louisiana, who lived and worked on Melrose Plantation.

Hunter was born into a Louisiana Creole family at Hidden Hill Plantation near Cloutierville, in Natchitoches Parish, Louisiana. She started working as a farm laborer when young, and never learned to read or write. In her fifties, she began to sell her paintings, which soon gained local and national attention for their complexity in depicting Black Southern life in the early 20th century.

Initially she sold her first paintings for as little as 25 cents. But by the end of her life, her work was being exhibited in museums and sold by dealers for thousands of dollars. Clementine Hunter produced an estimated 5,000 to 10,000 paintings in her lifetime. Hunter was granted an honorary Doctor of Fine Arts degree by Northwestern State University of Louisiana in 1986, and she is the first African-American artist to have a solo exhibition at the present-day New Orleans Museum of Art. In 2013, director Robert Wilson presented a new opera about her, entitled Zinnias: the Life of Clementine Hunter, at Montclair State University in New Jersey.

Early life

Clementine Hunter was born in late December 1886 or early January 1887 at Hidden Hill Plantation, near Cloutierville in Natchitoches Parish, Louisiana. She was the first of seven children born to Janvier Reuben (though Clementine Hunter called him John) and Mary Antoinette Adams. Hunter's siblings were named Maria, Ida, Rosa, Edward, Simon, and John. Hunter's maternal grandmother Idole, an enslaved Black and Native American woman, was born in Virginia and brought to Louisiana. Her maternal grandfather was called Billy Zack Adams. Hunter's paternal grandfather, who was of mixed African, French, and Irish descent, traded horses during the Civil War, but died before she was born. Hunter knew her paternal grandmother well, a Black and Native American woman who she called MéMé (pronounced May–May). Her parents were married on October 15, 1890, in Cloutierville at the town's Catholic church, St. John the Baptist.

She was baptized a Catholic on March 19, 1887, in Cloutierville, and it is known that she was about three months old. Although her exact date of birth is unknown, she said she was born around Christmas. She went by the name Clémence for the first part of her life, was baptized Clementiam and changed her name to Clementine after moving to Melrose Plantation. Her family called her by the nickname Tébé, the French for "little baby," a nickname she carried into adulthood.

Hunter moved at Cloutierville when she was around five years old and sent to St. John the Baptist Catholic Church School. The school was segregated and enforced harsh rules, which Hunter cited as the reason she left school at a young age. She attended school for less than a year, and never formally learned to read or write. Hunter began working in the fields at eight years old, picking cotton alongside her father. Throughout her life she moved around in the Cane River Valley while her father looked for work. At certain points she lived in Robeline, Cypress, and Alexandria. In 1902, around the age of fifteen, Hunter moved to Melrose Plantation.

Hunter's father, Janvier "John" Reuben was hired as a wage laborer by John H. Henry, the current owner of Melrose. Hunter also worked for a wage as an agricultural laborer, harvesting 150 to 200 pounds of cotton a day, making 75 cents. In the fall, she would also harvest pecans, working six days a week for months of the year. While in her teens, Hunter took informal classes at night with other workers at Melrose Plantation. Her mother, Mary Antoinette Reuben, died in 1905 at Melrose.

When Hunter was about twenty in 1907, she give birth to her first child, Joseph Dupree, called Frenchie. Hunter's first partner was Charles Dupree, a Creole man about fifteen years Hunter's senior. Charles is rumored to have built a steam engine with having only seen a picture and was well known for his highly skilled labor. Their second child, Cora, was born a few years later. Charles Dupree and Clementine Hunter never married, and Dupree died in 1914.

In 1924, Clementine married Emmanuel Hunter, a Creole woodchopper at Melrose six years her senior. Until Clementine Hunter married Emmanuel, she spoke only Creole French, and he taught her American English. The two lived together in a workers' cabin at Melrose Plantation and had five children, although two were stillborn. Hunter's children were named Agnes, King, and Mary, although she called Mary "Jackie". On the morning before giving birth to one of her children, she harvested 78 pounds of cotton, went home and called for the midwife. She was back working a few days later.

In the late 1920s, Hunter began working as cook and housekeeper for Cammie Henry, the wife of John H. Henry. She was known for her talent adapting traditional Creole recipes, sewing intricate clothes and dolls, and tending to the house's vegetable garden. Before long, Melrose evolved into a salon for artists and writers in this period, hosted by Cammie Henry. In the late 1930s, Clementine Hunter began to formally paint, using discarded tubes from the visiting artists at Melrose.

In the early 1940s, Hunter's husband Emmanuel became terminally ill and bedridden. She was now the sole financial provider for the family, working full time, while caring for Emmanuel, and painting late at night. Emmanuel died in 1944, leaving Hunter to work and care for her children alone.

During this period in the early 1940s, Hunter adopted Mary Francis LaCour, an eleven-year-old girl whose parents couldn't care for her. Hunter cared for the girl, teaching her how to paint, the two displaying her creations outside of Hunter's home. In her teens, Mary Francis moved to California to live with her father. In 1951, Mary Francis died at less than twenty years old.

Painting career 

Hunter has become one of the most well-known self-taught artists. Hunter is described as a memory painter because she documented Black Southern life in the Cane River Valley in the early 20th century. She was entirely self-taught and received almost no formal education, art or otherwise. Although she was first recognized for her painting skills in 1939, Hunter speaks about painting long before then. Her most famous work depicts brightly colored depictions of important events like funerals, baptisms, and weddings and scenes of plantation labor like picking cotton or pecans, and domestic labor. However, Hunter's paintings vary in subject and style, including many abstract paintings and still life paintings of zinnias.

Hunter painted from memory, stating: "I just get it in my mind and I just go ahead and paint but I can't look at nothing and paint. No trees, no nothing. I just make my own tree in my mind, that's the way I paint."

Cammie Henry created an artists' colony after the death of her husband at Melrose Plantation. Numerous artists and writers visited, including Lyle Saxon, Roark Bradford, Alexander Woollcott, Rose Franken, Gwen Bristow, and Richard Avedon. Frequently, the paint and brushes left by New Orleans artist Alberta Kinsey are cited as the first materials Hunter used to paint with on a window shade. However, it's clear from Hunter's textile work that she was producing narrative and expressionist work before painting. Additionally, Hunter's own accounts of her early career contradict the story of Kinsey's influence, Hunter has spoken about painting earlier than 1939.

Hunter began selling paintings after the death of her husband, Emmanuel Hunter. On the outside of the cabin where she lived was a sign that read: "Clementine Hunter, Artist. 25 cents to Look." Clementine Hunter's first shows were in 1945 in Rosenwald Grant, Brownwood, and Waco Texas. In 1949, a show of Hunter's paintings at the New Orleans Arts and Crafts Show garnered attention outside of the Cane River Valley. An article was published about Hunter in Look magazine in June 1953, giving her national exposure.

Hunter gained support from numerous individuals associated with Melrose Plantation, including François Mignon, a friend of Cammie Henry and Clementine Hunter. He supplied her with paint and materials, and promoted her widely. Hunter's paintings were displayed in the local drugstore, where they were sold for one dollar.

In 1956, Hunter and François Mignon coauthored Melrose Plantation Cookbook, featuring photographs of Melrose Plantation, illustrations drawn by Hunter, and recipes. Hunter was skilled at reinterpreting traditional dishes, which were passed down in her family by oral tradition.

Hunter's largest work is a series of murals in the African House at Melrose Plantation. Built the early 19th century by enslaved people at Melrose Plantation, the African House is a Creole hybridization of various African, French, Native American building traditions. However, little is known about its construction and early uses, however it is known that it served as a storehouse and during Cammie Henry's ownership as a residence for artists. In 1949, Clementine Hunter's first show in the Cane River Valley was hosted by Mignon in the upstairs area of the African House. Hunter painted Murals in the Yucca house and the main Melrose Plantation house. In 1955, Hunter and François Mignon collaborated to produce the series of paneled murals that depict the history of the Cane River Valley and reflect the artist's life. The mural consists of nine rectangular panels, each painted in Hunter's home studio. Completed over three months, the murals were finished Hunter was sixty-eight years old.

Hunter's paintings changed throughout her lifetime. Her early work, such as "Cane River Baptism" from 1950, features more earth tones and muted colors. Before the patronage and support from François Mignon and others, Hunter used paint left by visiting artists at Melrose Plantation, therefore she was working within other artists' palettes. Additionally, Hunter would frequently thin out her supply of paint with turpentine, creating more of a watercolor effect, which caused many Hunter scholars to believe she had a watercolor experimental phase. Beginning in the 1950s, her painting style was altered by arthritis in her hands. From this period on, she leaned more towards abstract and impressionist work, with less fine detail, because it was difficult for her to paint. In 1962, her friend James Pipes Register encouraged her to become even more abstract, painting works like Clementine Makes a Quilt. However, by 1964, Hunter returned to more narrative works. In the 1980s, as she approached one hundred years old, she began painting on smaller, more handheld objects like jugs.

In late 1971, sixty of Hunter's paintings were shown at an exhibition at Louisiana State University.

Quiltmaking
Hunter lived in communities of Black sharecroppers and tenant farmers where she learned to sew clothes and household items. Before she began painting, she would sew clothes for family, would make quilts, weave baskets. François Mignon recognized Hunter's talents with fabric and sewing before he saw any of her painted works. On December 19, 1939, Mignon recorded in his journals that Clementine (Mignon called her Clemence) first showed him dolls she created with embroidered features. Additionally, he wrote that she was exceptionally talented at making fringe and can spin cotton. James Register also recorded Clementine Hunter's exceptional skill at making fringe in an article in the Natchitoches Times in 1972. She could also make hand-tied lace curtains.

Hunter's quilts and tapestries are clear examples of her artistic talent before she began painting, and feature subjects and her color palette that are central to the majority of her artwork. Many of her quilts are titled "Melrose Quilt" or "Melrose Plantation" Textile or Tapestry as many of them depict buildings on the Melrose grounds. The Melrose Plantation Textile, which is hand appliquéd and sewn, is from 1938 or 1939, and is thematically similar to her painted works. Most of Hunter's textile work is owned in private collections; however, a photograph of Hunter in her home shows her using one of her Chevron as a couch covering. Each square is hand sewn together. Many of Hunter's quilts are not batted, which signals that they are designed to hang as a tapestry, rather than serve a household function.

Hunter made several quilts that are more abstract. One Chevron Quilt is at the New Orleans Museum of Art. Some of the squares of chevron are alternating solid colors, while other squares are pieces of scrap patterned cloth. Although Hunter's abstract paintings made in 1962 and 1936 are generally regarded as a break in her canon, her early textile work and paintings play with abstraction and impressionism. Additionally, Shelby Gilley's collection of Hunter's "Crazy Quilts" or Chevron quilts are dated as 1960, and the Chevron Quilt at the New Orleans Museum of Art is dated 1951, before her collaboration with James Register.

Legacy and honors
A director of the Museum of American Folk Art in New York City described Hunter as "the most celebrated of all Southern contemporary painters."

Hunter was the first African-American artist to have a solo exhibition at the Delgado Museum (now the New Orleans Museum of Art). In February 1985, the museum hosted A New Orleans Salute to Clementine Hunter's Centennial, an exhibit in honor of her one-hundredth birthday. She achieved significant recognition during her lifetime, including an invitation to the White House from U.S. President Jimmy Carter and letters from both President Ronald Reagan and U.S. Senator J. Bennett Johnston, Jr.

Radcliffe College included Hunter in its Black Women Oral History Project, published in 1980. An interview with Hunter is part of the Black Women Oral History Project records, 1976–1997, housed at Harvard University, Radcliffe Institute, Schlesinger Library. In the Mildred H. Bailey Collection of Interviews at Northwestern State University of Louisiana, there are digitized interviews with Hunter and those closest to her.

Northwestern State University of Louisiana granted her an honorary Doctor of Fine Arts degree in 1986. The following year, Louisiana governor Edwin Edwards designated her as an honorary colonel, a state honor, and aide-de-camp.

A biography, Clementine Hunter: Cane River Artist (2012), was co-written by Tom Whitehead, a retired journalism professor who knew Hunter well. \

Hunter has been the subject of biographies and artist studies, and inspired other works of art. In 2013, composer Robert Wilson presented a new opera about her: Zinnias: the Life of Clementine Hunter, at Montclair State University in New Jersey. Shinnerrie Jackson's one-woman musical Ain't I a Woman? honors the lives of four influential African American women, including Hunter.

Hunter's work can be found in numerous museums such as the Dallas Museum of Fine Art, the American Folk Art Museum, Minneapolis Institute of Arts, the Ogden Museum of Southern Art, the New Orleans Museum of Art, and the Louisiana State Museum.

Clementine Hunter's World is a 2017 documentary directed by noted Hunter scholar Art Shiver. The film celebrates Hunter's life and artwork through the lens of photographs, oral histories, and the newly resorted African House Murals. In addition to the film, the Smithsonian National Museum of African American History & Culture created an exhibition centering on Hunter called "Clementine Hunter: Life on Melrose Plantation." According to Smithsonian American Art curator Tuliza Fleming, the 22 works by Hunter is the largest collection by a single artist at the museum.

In 2019, Louisiana State Legislators passed a resolution that designated October 1 as Clementine Hunter Day. Loletta Jones-Wynder, the director of the Creole Heritage Center at Northwestern State University of Louisiana, created the resolution to honor Hunter's legacy and impact on the State of Louisiana.

Forgeries
As Hunter became increasingly more famous over her lifetime, and began selling her painted works for more money, forged paintings started becoming a problem. Relatives of Clementine Hunter and Cammie Henry created forgeries, although very few. Although there were many Hunter fakes, William and Beryl Toye were the most prolific. In 1974, William J. Toye was charged with forging twenty-two Hunter paintings by the New Orleans police. Toye was able to pass these paintings off as Hunter originals because he recreated her distinctive signature, a backwards C and an H interlocking. William Toye's wife Beryl claimed that she purchased the paintings directly from Hunter at Melrose Plantation in the 1960s. Toye's case never went to trial, despite verification from Hunter herself that she had not painted the works. In 1996, Toye was accused of forging Matisse and Degas paintings, selling them to an auction house in Baton Rouge. Toye likely began forging Hunter paintings again in 1999, selling them or using them as a form of payment for doctor's bills or as collateral for a bank loan until the mid 2000s.

Toye sold many his fakes to New Orleans art and antiques dealer, Robert Lucky Jr. Lucky intentionally lied to his customers about the origins of fifty to one hundred Hunter paintings, reselling paintings that were returned as fakes. In 2000, Robert Lucky Jr. took payment for a Hunter painting that he never gave to the customer, and was charged and arrested. Some noted Hunter collectors caught on his scheme, such as Robert Ryan who returned some paintings bought from Lucky, demanding a refund. Shelby Gilley and Tom Whitehead, scholars, collectors, and friends of Hunter, also figured out that the bulk of Hunter fakes were coming from Lucky, leading them to open an investigation. Whitehead had bought a total of seventeen fake Clementine Hunter paintings from Lucky, spending a total of $55,000.

In 2005, Tom Whitehead, Shelby Gilley, and Jack Brittain hired Frank Preusser, an art authentication expert, to investigate these forgeries. Preusser analyzed the materials used in the paintings in question, compared to those sold by Lucky and determined that they were in fact inconsistent materials. The investigation uncovered paintings sold by William Toye, which were consistent with the fakes sold by Robert Lucky Jr., as Toye began selling the fakes directly to buyers in 2005. At that time, Beryl Toye was selling Hunter fakes for $3,500 a painting at a New Orleans auction house.

In 2009, Federal Bureau of Investigation Special Agent Randolph Deaton assembled a team of noted art authentication experts, to begin a formal investigation into the forgeries. The team included Joseph Barabe of McCrone Associates, a scientific analysis company and James Martin a forensic art expert of Orion Analytical. The group used several methods to analyze Hunter's original works to compare to the alleged forgeries, including an analysis of pigment cracks, paint age, painting style. However, one of the most important clues that a painting was a Hunter original were her fingerprints on the back of the oil paintings. Hunter did not use an easel, so the backs and borders of her paintings are smudged with paint, unlike the forgeries by Toye who used an easel to paint his fakes.

In September 2009, the FBI determined that William Toye was the one producing the forgeries and raided his home. Toye, who was accused of selling forged paintings three times over the course of four decades, pleaded guilty in federal court on June 6, 2011. The couple was charged with mail fraud and conspiracy to commit mail fraud. The price for Hunter paintings ranged between a few thousand dollars to $20,000, according to Tom Whitehead.  Both William and Beryl Toye were sentenced to two years probation and a $426,393 fine for the cost of the fakes sold. Robert Lucky Jr. was charged with mail fraud and pled guilty, was sentenced to twenty-five months in prison and a $326,893 fine.

This investigation was crucial to protecting Hunter's legacy, as many of the fakes were shown in museums in private collections around the world. Additionally, very few FBI forgery cases investigate folk artists or outsider artists, and so this case helped to legitimize the value of self-taught artists.

Selected works and collections

Funeral Procession, ca. 1950, Savannah College of Art and Design
Untitled, 1981, National Museum of Women in the Arts, Washington, D.C.
The Wash, ca. 1950s, Minneapolis Institute of Art, Minneapolis, MN
Picking Cotton, ca. 1950s, Minneapolis Institute of Art, Minneapolis, MN
The Annunciation and the Adoration of the Wise Men, 1957, Museum of Fine Arts, Boston, MA
Cotton Pickin', 1948, American Folk Art Museum, New York, NY
Saturday Night, 1965, American Folk Art Museum, New York, NY
Funeral, 1957, Muscarelle Museum of Art, Williamsburg, VA
Sugar Cane Syrup Makin', 1979, Muscarelle Museum of Art, Williamsburg, VA
Baptism, Late 1950s, Muscarelle Museum of Art, Williamsburg, VA
Window Shade, 1950s, National Museum of African American History and Culture, Washington, D.C.

Studies and other related books

 Mildred Hart Bailey, Four Women of Cane River (1980)
Shelby R. Gilley, Painting by Heart: The Life and Art of Clementine Hunter, Louisiana Folk Artist (2000), St. Emma Press
Clementine Hunter, Clementine Hunter: A Sketchbook (2014), University of New Orleans Press. 
Mary E. Lyons, Talking with Tebé (1998), Houghton Mifflin. 
François Mignon, illustrated by Clementine Hunter, Melrose Plantation Cookbook (1956), ASIN B000CS68QA
 Art Shiver, Tom Whitehead (editors), Clementine Hunter: The African House Murals (2005), Northwestern State University of Louisiana Press. 
 Art Shiver, Tom Whitehead (co-authors), Clementine Hunter Her Life and Art (2012), LSU Press. 
James Register, illustrated by Clementine Hunter, The Joyous Coast (1971), Mid-South Press, Shreveport, Louisiana
James Wilson, Clementine Hunter: American Folk Artist (1990), Pelican Publishing Company

See also 
 Mose Tolliver
 Outsider art
 Folk Art
 Southern art
Melrose Plantation

References

External links
 Jennifer Moses, "Looking for Clementine Hunter's Louisiana" The New York Times (June 14, 2013). Retrieved June 17, 2013
 "Clementine Hunter: A Sketchbook", University of New Orleans Press/Ogden Museum of Southern Art 
 
 Ashleigh Barice, "Artist in focus: Clementine Hunter", Art UK, March 9, 2017
 

1880s births
1988 deaths
Year of birth uncertain
African-American women artists
Outsider artists
Women outsider artists
20th-century American women artists
Artists from Louisiana
20th-century American painters
Painters from Louisiana
People from Natchitoches Parish, Louisiana
American centenarians
African-American centenarians
Women centenarians
African-American Catholics
20th-century African-American women
20th-century African-American painters
American quilters